The fifth encirclement campaign against Kiangsi (Jiangxi) Soviet was a series of battles fought during the Chinese Civil War from 25 September 1933, to October 1934 between Chiang Kai-shek's Chinese Nationalists (Kuomintang) and the Chinese Communists. During this campaign, the Kuomintang successfully overran the communist Chinese Soviet Republic and forced the Communists on the run, an event later known as the Long March.

Chiang Kai-shek and the Nationalists termed this campaign the fifth encirclement campaign (pinyin: dì wǔ cì wéijiǎo), whilst the Communists termed it the fifth counter-encirclement campaign at the Central Soviet (pinyin:zhōngyāng Sūqū dì wǔ cì fǎnwéijiǎo), also known as the fifth counter-encirclement campaign at the Central Revolutionary Base (pinyin: Zhōngyāng gémìng gēnjùdì dì wǔ cì fǎnwéijiǎo) or fifth extermination campaign.

Prelude
After the failure of the fourth encirclement campaign in the spring of 1933, Chiang Kai-shek immediately mobilized troops for the next campaign. Nationalist troops eventually totaled more than one million, mostly forces under various regional warlords, of which the largest part were men from the Guangdong warlord Chen Jitang's army of 300,000+ (or 30% of the total nationalist force). Chen Jitang's troops were mobilized to blockade the southern border of the Jiangxi Soviet.  However, most of the warlords were somewhat half-hearted towards the campaign, due to a mixture of only wanting to keep their own power and having already seen four previous campaigns fail. In the end, the majority of warlord troops only participated as block-troops and occupiers of the captured communist regions. Chiang Kai-shek's own Kuomintang troops carried out the majority of the fighting.

As the commander-in-chief of the Nationalist forces, Chiang Kai-shek established his headquarters in Nanchang. In addition to mobilizing the warlords' troops, Chiang also adopted the strategy of systematic encirclement of the Jiangxi Soviet region with fortified blockhouses. This strategy has been attributed to his German advisers' (Hans von Seeckt and Alexander von Falkenhausen), however this is unlikely. Instead, the Nationalists innovated the strategy themselves.

The blockhouses proved to be very effective. In an effort to break the blockade, the Red Army—under the orders of a three-man committee consisting of Bo Gu, Zhou Enlai and Li De (Otto Braun)—besieged the forts many times, but suffered heavy casualties with little success. The Jiangxi Soviet shrunk significantly due to the Chinese Red Army's disastrous loss of manpower and material throughout the year, and by the end only a handful of towns and cities remained in Communist hands.

First phase
The campaign officially began on 25 September 1933, when the first Kuomintang assault on Communist positions was launched. Three days later the Communists lost Lichuan (黎川).  Although their force managed to stop the Nationalist advance on the southwest of Lichuan (黎川), further operations ended in failure: when the 24th division of the Chinese Red Army attempted to take Xiaoshi (硝石) on 9 October 1933, not only did the city remain firmly in Nationalist hands, but the communists were forced to withdraw over the next few days while suffering heavy casualties. Witnessing this success, Chiang Kai-shek issued a new order on 17 October 1933, requiring troops to follow the principle of tactical defense, strategic offense in order to perfect his German advisers' blockhouse strategy. In contrast, the Communist leadership refused to adjust their tactics and stubbornly continued futile attacks on Kuomintang blockhouses. Between September 25, 1933, and mid-November 1933, the Chinese Red Army failed to achieve any major victories and suffered serious losses, not only in battle but from defection and disease.

Second phase
On 11 December 1933, a total of eight columns of Kuomintang troops ventured out of their fortifications and started the second offensive. The Communist leadership decided to face the numerically and technically superior Nationalist army in open battle. As a result, Communist forces suffered badly. By the end of January 1934, warlord forces began to participate, and men from the Fujian warlord armies struck from the east in coordination with Nationalists from the north and south.

Third phase
On April 10, 1934, eleven divisions of the National Revolutionary Army began their attack on Guangchang (广昌), and the communists decided to concentrate a total of nine divisions in its defense. Due to overwhelming Nationalist superiority, Communist strongholds at Ganzhu (甘竹), Great Luo Mountain (大罗山) and Yanfuzhang (延福嶂) fell. On the dawn of 19 April 1934, the Communists launched a counterattack against the Nationalist force at the Great Luo Mountain, only to be driven off. On 27 April 1934, the Nationalists launched their final assault on Guangchang, succeeding in taking it by the evening and inflicting over 5,500 casualties on its Communist defenders. Remnants of the shattered Communist defense fled to the south and west under the cover of darkness.

Final phase
The three-man committee of the communist leadership divided their force into six different groups in early July 1934. On 5 August 1934, nine Nationalist divisions ventured out of their forts, taking areas north of Yichian (驛前, Yìqián) and adjacent regions. By the late September 1934, the Chinese Soviet Republic was left with only Juicheng, Hweichang, Hsingkwo, Ningtu, Shihcheng, Ninghwa and Changting.

It was at this point that Chou En-lai's spy network within Chiang Kai-shek's headquarters in Nanchang passed intelligence to the Communists revealing that Chiang was massing for a final push. The decision was made to abandon the Kiangsi Soviet, resulting in the beginning of the Long March.  As a result of the Communist failure to defeat the fifth encirclement, the largest Communist base in China was lost.

Conclusion
Communist failures were mainly due to the policies of the Communist leadership:

 The fifth encirclement campaign was a war of attrition, and the Communists were unable to replace lost troops and material. Unlike Mao Zedong, the new leadership believed the era of guerrilla warfare and mobile warfare was over, and tried to engage in regular warfare.
 Hostility towards all Nationalist troops.  Under Mao's direction, warlord forces had been distinguished from Central Army units of Chiang Kai-shek's Nationalist government, sometimes allowing for a tenuous neutrality with the warlords.  As a result, only 50,000 of Chiang Kai-shek's own troops were available in the 1st, 2nd, 3rd and - to a great degree - 4th encirclement campaigns.  When the new leadership took over, all Nationalist troops and those fighting with them were regarded as enemies of equal danger. Instead of having to fight an enemy force much smaller than it was on paper, the Communists had to fight a much larger enemy.
 Static defense: in addition to head-on clashes, the Red Army was also ordered to emulate the Nationalist static defense. Unlike the Nationalist's concrete fortifications, which were immune to virtually all Communist bombardments, Communist bunkers were built with wood and mud and were susceptible not only to Nationalist artillery but even to heavy rain and wind.  These hastily, and badly constructed, bunkers only served to aid the Nationalists by becoming death traps for Communist defenders.
 Poor use of intelligence. The Communist leadership lacked serious interest in intelligence collection or use.  While the Communists had already broken the Nationalist codes in the previous Counter encirclement campaigns, greatly helping in earlier successes, the new leadership did not trust the cryptography enough to make or alter plans according to new intelligence.  This problem continued until the Long March, when Mao finally returned to power and began utilizing both cryptographic and human intelligence collection as a major part of their campaigns.
 Increased nationalist strength.  In previous campaigns, Nationalist forces had insufficient troops to occupy newly conquered regions or act as rearguards, so soldiers were only stationed in urban areas or fixed fortifications. Large gaps were left between these garrisons, which Communists were able to use to harry defences and penetrate deep into the heart of Nationalist-controlled regions.  During the fifth encirclement campaign, Chiang had ten times the number of troops at his disposal than in previous campaigns, with a total of half a million. As a result, the encirclement was far more effective, with gaps between garrisons eliminated and conquered regions more easily consolidated.

See also
Chinese Civil War
Sino-German cooperation (1911–1941)
First encirclement campaign
Second encirclement campaign
Third encirclement campaign
Fourth encirclement campaign

References

Bibliography 
Zhu, Zongzhen and Wang, Chaoguang, Liberation War History, 1st Edition, Social Scientific Literary Publishing House in Beijing, 2000,  (set)
Zhang, Ping, History of the Liberation War, 1st Edition, Chinese Youth Publishing House in Beijing, 1987,  (pbk.)
Jie, Lifu, Records of the Liberation War: The Decisive Battle of Two Kinds of Fates, 1st Edition, Hebei People's Publishing House in Shijiazhuang, 1990,  (set)
Literary and Historical Research Committee of the Anhui Committee of the Chinese People's Political Consultative Conference, Liberation War, 1st Edition, Anhui People's Publishing House in Hefei, 1987, 
Li, Zuomin, Heroic Division and Iron Horse: Records of the Liberation War, 1st Edition, Chinese Communist Party History Publishing House in Beijing, 2004, 
Wang, Xingsheng, and Zhang, Jingshan, Chinese Liberation War, 1st Edition, People's Liberation Army Literature and Art Publishing House in Beijing, 2001,  (set)
Huang, Youlan, History of the Chinese People's Liberation War, 1st Edition, Archives Publishing House in Beijing, 1992, 
Liu Wusheng, From Yan'an to Beijing: A Collection of Military Records and Research Publications of Important Campaigns in the Liberation War, 1st Edition, Central Literary Publishing House in Beijing, 1993, 
Tang, Yilu and Bi, Jianzhong, History of Chinese People's Liberation Army in Chinese Liberation War, 1st Edition, Military Scientific Publishing House in Beijing, 1993 – 1997,  (Volum 1), 7800219615 (Volum 2), 7800219631 (Volum 3), 7801370937 (Volum 4), and 7801370953 (Volum 5)

Jiangxi Soviet, encirclement campaign, 5th
Conflicts in 1933
Conflicts in 1934
1933 in China
1934 in China
Military history of Jiangxi